Michael Mayo (born Syracuse, New York) is an American poet, and editor.

Life
He studied at the University of Maine, University of New Brunswick, and the University of Delaware.  He lived for ten years in San Francisco.  Since 1993, he has lived in Puerto Vallarta.

Awards
 1987 American Book Award

Works
 
 The Book of Awakenings

References

External links

American male poets
Writers from Syracuse, New York
University of Maine alumni
University of New Brunswick alumni
University of Delaware alumni
Living people
Poets from New York (state)
American Book Award winners
Year of birth missing (living people)